Sailfish OS is a Linux-based operating system based on free software, and open source projects such as Mer as well as including a closed source UI. The project is being developed by the Finnish company Jolla.

The OS first shipped with the original Jolla Phone in 2013; while its sale stopped in 2016, it  was supplied with software updates until the end of 2020. It also shipped with Jolla Tablet in 2015 and from other vendors licensing the OS. The OS is ported by community enthusiasts to third-party mobile devices including smartphones and tablet computers. Sailfish OS can be used for many kinds of devices.

History and development

The OS is an evolved continuation of the Linux MeeGo OS previously developed by alliance of Nokia and Intel which itself relies on combined Maemo and Moblin. The MeeGo legacy is contained in the Mer core in about 80% of its code; the Mer name thus expands to MEego Reconstructed. This base is extended by Jolla with a custom user interface and default applications. Jolla and MERproject.org follow a meritocratic system to avoid the mistakes that led to the MeeGo project's then-unanticipated discontinuation.

The main elements for  include:

 Technically stronger OS core
 Improved Android application compatibility 
 Support for ARM and Intel architectures, including the Intel Atom x3 processor, or any platform with kernel useable (settle-able) for MER core stack (also called middleware of Sailfish). 
 Design to provide visibility in the UI for digital content providers and to enable OS level integration for mobile commerce 
 Strong multitasking (one of the most important advantage of the OS and declared to be the best one on the market) 
 Strong privacy and personalization features
 Enhanced user interface with new UI/UX features, including simpler swipe access to main functions, enhanced notifications and events views.

Software architecture
The  and the Sailfish software development kit (SDK) are based on the Linux kernel and Mer.  includes a multi-tasking graphical shell called "Lipstick" built with Qt by Jolla on top of the Wayland display server protocol. Jolla uses free and open-source graphics device drivers but the Hybris library allows use of proprietary drivers for Android. Jolla's stated goal is for Sailfish to be open source eventually.

 can run some Android applications through a proprietary compatibility layer.

Targeted device classes
Sailfish is targeted at mobile devices. Since it inherited around 80% of MeeGo code, Sailfish can be used as a complete general-purpose Linux OS on devices including in vehicle infotainment (IVI), navigation, smart TV, desktops and notebooks, yachts, automotive, e-commerce, home appliances, measuring and control equipment, smart building equipment, etc.

Sailfish OS SDK
The  SDK was announced at the Slush Helsinki conference in 2012, and the alpha was published in February 2013. The SDK, installation and coding tutorials are available for free download from the  website despite the overall license not being open source.

Sailfish SDK uses Qt with VirtualBox for development, compiling and emulation purposes, in contrast to the simulation method. This also separates development activities and side effects from everything else running on the host computer, leaving it undisturbed by developments and tests. According to Jolla, development with Sailfish SDK is development on  itself; there are no differences between developed software appearance and behaviour in the SDK and on a device running .

The availability of source code to the SDK allows shaping and rebuilding to companies' or developers' specific needs, creating a context-specific environment that is set once and needs no preparation when the device is booted. The SDK runs on the operating systems Android, 32- and 64-bit versions of Linux, 64-bit versions of OS X, and Microsoft Windows. It can be used for compiling software for  devices from Linux sources. Its general console/terminal mode follows a commonly used standard. Compatible binaries or libraries can also be used.

Application programming interfaces
 uses open source Qt APIs (Qt 5, QtQuick 2 etc.) and a closed source Sailfish Silica for the UI. Standard Linux APIs are provided by the Mer Core.

Sailfish, Ubuntu and Plasma Active have been cooperating to share common APIs. When successful, this will make the platforms compatible on the API level.

Sailfish Browser is the default web browser based on Gecko and using embedlite (also known as IPCLiteAPI), a lite-weight embedding API from Mozilla.

Software overview

UI supported human languages
Officially Jolla declares supporting the following 14 languages for the user interface:
Danish, German, English (UK), Spanish, French, Italian, Norwegian, Polish, Portuguese, Finnish, Swedish, Russian, Chinese (mainland), and Chinese (Hong Kong). For each of them, the OS has a dedicated keyboard. There are a few more languages which are unofficially supported by community freelancers not under control by Jolla, hence more than 20 languages are supported in total. Additional languages can be installed by skilled users due to the Linux architecture.

Public "Early access" for beta testers and developers
After positive experiences with pushing early updates to a small group of opt-in users for Sailfish Update 9 and for the connectivity hotfix, Jolla has allowed all interested parties to try a new version of  about 1–2 weeks before official release, in a program called "Early access". It is expected to be useful for developers and technically minded users, and a step towards more community integration into the Sailfish release process, including improvement of quality by identifying critical issues which only show up in certain environments or device setups, before rolling the update out to the wider user audience.

In the long term it will help Jolla to establish a developer program with early release candidate access for registered developers, and to have more community involvement in platform development. The first detail Jolla is hoping to learn from this is how it can gather feedback from a large audience in a reasonable way.

Basic details about the early access update:

 The early release access is meant primarily for advanced users and developers.
 To sign up for the program there is a checkbox in the Jolla accounts profile page.
 Installed early-access release cannot be downgraded. The only way to downgrade from early access releases is to do a factory reset after removing the sign up check from the user's account profile.
 Early access releases should be considered "reasonably stable". Issues found during that period will either be fixed, or added to "known issues" on the release notes.
 Signing up for the early access releases will not void warranty.

Version history
 has three naming conventions: version number, update number and version name.
 Sailfish OS 1.0 versions were named after Finnish lakes.
 Sailfish OS 2.0 supports the Jolla Tablet with x86 platforms and featured a reworked touch based UI. Releases were named after Finnish rivers.
 Sailfish OS 3.0 and 4.0 features a slightly reworked UI. Releases are named after Finnish national parks.
 Sailfish OS 4.1, 4.2, 4.3, 4.4 and 4.5 features 64 bit support on the Sony Xperia 10 II, plus a new sharing system. Releases are named after Finnish Unesco world heritage sites.

Stop releases
When updating an installed Sailfish OS from an earlier release, for example after device factory reset, there are several stop releases which must not be skipped and have to be installed before continuing on the path to subsequent releases.  These releases provide new functionality that is not compatible with previous releases and have to be traversed in order not to put the Sailfish OS installation into an unstable state.

Porting
The Sailfish website publishes an online compendium of knowledge, links and instructions on porting issues.

Using Android software running on 
In addition to its native applications, Sailfish can run some Android applications by installing them from an application store or directly through an APK file. Supported Android versions are 4.1.2 "Jelly Bean" on the original Jolla phone; 4.4.4 "Kit-Kat" on the Jolla C, Jolla tablet and Xperia X; 8.1.0 "Oreo", 9 "Pie" and 10 (depending on the Sailfish OS release) on Xperia XA2, Xperia 10 and Xperia 10 II. Problems can arise if these applications were built without following Android standards about controls, which might not display correctly and so become unusable.

Sailfish OS uses Alien Dalvik, a proprietary Android compatibility layer. It does not emulate Android, but instead implements its APIs by adapting the Android Open Source Project (AOSP) code to run as an application. Android applications can thus run at native speed without any perceivable slow-down. Sailfish can run both native Sailfish and Android software simultaneously, with the user switching between them on the fly.

Starting with Alien Dalvik 8.1 (also called "Android App Support" since then), it uses LXC to improve security by better isolation, in the same way the open source Android compatibility layer Anbox is doing.

Hardware overview

Advantages of the Mer standard
 can be used on any hardware with Linux-kernel support and compatible with the middleware utilising the Mer core. Community enthusiasts have ported  to a number of devices this way. Instead of designation to a specific reference hardware platform, a VirtualBox implementation with the  SDK is available for development on Linux, OS X and Windows operating systems. This virtual machine implementation contains the whole  isolated from local resources and the local OS to enable convenient evaluation of the behaviour and performance of coded or ported software before deployment on real devices.

Jolla devices
 Jolla C
 Jolla Tablet
 Jolla Phone

Devices from other vendors licensing 
Manufacturers can provide mobile equipment with a licensed , or as open source, or combining both and including their own or the operator's modifications and branding for specific markets or purposes.
 Sony Xperia 10 III - via Sailfish X
 Sony Xperia 10 II – via Sailfish X
 Sony Xperia 10 Plus – via Sailfish X
 Sony Xperia 10 – via Sailfish X
 Planet Computers Gemini PDA – via Sailfish X
 Sony Xperia XA2 Plus – via Sailfish X
 Sony Xperia XA2 Ultra – via Sailfish X
 Sony Xperia XA2 – via Sailfish X
 Sony Xperia X – via Sailfish X

Community enthusiasts' ports to devices from other vendors
Due to the relative ease of porting and the open source license,  has also been unofficially ported to other 3rd-party devices. The Hardware Adaptation Development Kit for porters has been published and is free. These ports are mostly published on the Maemo and XDA Developers forums, and in the Mer wiki a list of the ports is compiled. Due to license restrictions, proprietary parts or extensions such as the Alien Dalvik compatibility layer for Android apps are not included. However they can be added, e.g. when a manufacturer or distributor turns it from the community version into an officially supported version for a particular device. From the originally more than 80 ports, there are about 19 ports that are still in active development – as of March 2019 – meaning they have been updated to Sailfish 3:

 Alcatel Idol 3
 Fairphone 2
 F(x)tec Pro1
 HP TouchPad
 Motorola Moto Z Play
 Motorola Photon Q
 Motorola Moto X Force
 Motorola Moto X 2014
 Motorola Moto G 2014
 Motorola Moto G 2015
 Motorola Moto G4 Plus
 OnePlus X
 OnePlus One
 OnePlus 3
 OnePlus 3T
 OnePlus 5
 OnePlus 5T
 PinePhone
 Samsung Galaxy A5
 Sony Xperia X Compact
 Xiaomi Redmi 2
 Volla Phone/Volla Phone X
 Xiaomi Redmi Note 3
 Xiaomi Redmi Note 4
 Xiaomi Redmi 5 Plus
Xiaomi Redmi 4X

To display the ease of porting  to other devices, Jolla showed created ports and community ports at events like the Mobile World Congress, Slush and FOSDEM:

 Nokia N950
 Nokia N9
 Google Nexus 7
 Google Nexus 4
 Samsung Galaxy S3
 Xiaomi Mi 2
 TCL Idol X950
 Google Nexus 5
 Fairphone 2
 Sony Xperia X
 Jolla Sailfish Watch
 Sony Xperia XA2
 Planet Computers Gemini PDA
 a feature phone similar to the Nokia 3310 assumed to be the Chinese Kingsun EF33

OS development status
 is promoted by Jolla and supported by the open Sailfish Alliance established in 2011, a group established to unite OEM and ODM manufacturers, chipset providers, operators, application developers and retailers. On 16 August 2012, the user interface was reported to be ready for release. Jolla's CEO Jussi Hurmola stated in a ZDNet interview, " ... Our UI is ready now, we haven't released it yet, we will save it for the product launch and the platform is getting up now so the project looks pretty nice".

The next day, Jolla's CEO Marc Dillon said on social networking website Twitter that the company had reached the first development target. Sailfish was debuted by the Jolla team, including a worldwide internet stream, as a demo of the OS, and the UI and SDK during the Slush event in Helsinki, Finland, on 21–22 November 2012. The alpha stage of  SDK was published at the end of February 2013 and was made available for free download.

On 16 September 2013, Jolla announced that its OS had been made compatible with Android applications and hardware. The first telephone to use it was launched on 27 November 2013 at a pop-up DNA Kauppa shop in Helsinki. The first 450 telephones were sold at this event, while the rest of the preordered devices were shipped shortly after.

In August 2015, version 1.1.9 "Eineheminlampi" was released, which added the main elements of the revamped  user interface.

In May 2016 Jolla announced the Sailfish Community Device Program, supporting developers and members of  community.

Aurora OS

Jolla staff met with members of the Russian technology community to break ground on the new software and promote , as part of Jolla's BRICS strategy. As a result of those efforts, on 18 May 2015 the Russian minister of communications Nikolai Nikiforov announced plans to replace Apple's iOS and Google's Android platforms with new software based on Sailfish. He intends it to cover 50% of Russian needs in this area during next ten years, in comparison to the 95% currently covered with western technology. The Russian version is currently being developed under the brand name Mobile OS "Aurora" (мобильная ОС «Аврора»), before 2019 as "Sailfish Mobile OS RUS". The Chinese multinational technology company Huawei was in talks with the Russian Ministry of Communications to install Aurora OS on tablets for Russia’s population census by August 2020.
Jolla has cut business ties with Russia in 2021.

Sailfish Alliance
Sailfish Alliance is the open alliance established in 2011 by Jolla company to support the MeeGo ecosystem with new products, services and business opportunities around or using Sailfish OS, a Linux operating system combining Mer with proprietary components from Jolla and other parties, for various purposes and mobile devices.

The alliance is seen as a competitor to other groups like Android's Open Handset Alliance.

In 2011 some of the MeeGo team working at Nokia left, and were funded by Nokia though their "Bridge" program to fund spin-out projects by ex-employees. The Sailfish Alliance has sought to collaborate between the Finnish software developers, and overseas handset manufacturers, some of which are in China. The news media reports that a number of manufacturers in China and India want an alternative to Android.

The Alliance aims to "unite OEM and ODM manufacturers, chipset providers, operators, application developers and retailers."

Business strategy
The aim of the Alliance is to offer unique differentiation opportunities and sustainable competitive advantage for OEM and ODM manufacturers, chipset providers, operators, application developers, retailers and other interested in sides.

Sailfish Secure
The Sailfish Secure is an open and secure mobile phone platform, based on Sailfish OS. It was introduced publicly in Barcelona, Spain at Mobile World Congress on 2 March 2015 where plans for the Sailfish Secure were presented.

It is based on a security-hardened version of the Sailfish OS and SSH's communication encryption and key management platform. Developed by Jolla (the Sailfish OS designer and developer) together with SSH Communications Security (the inventor of Secure Shell SSH protocol) in collaboration of Sailfish Alliance.

The hardware platform independent approach of the Sailfish Secure allow concept adaptation to local needs, and also in collaboration with other security partners. End customers like governments or large corporations are able to adapt the solution to their preferred or used hardware platform, as it is not tied to a specific hardware or configuration.

The aim is to answer increasing demand in privacy in mobile communications. Jolla and Sailfish OS has unique position to create and provide an alternative solution on markets dominated by Android or other non-EU based OSes. Target customers need a secure mobile solution, including government officials or corporations, but it is also intended to be affordable for consumers.

See also

 Comparison of mobile operating systems
 Hongmeng OS
 KaiOS
 Nokia Asha platform 
 Nokia X platform

References

External links

 
 SailfishOSwiki, a site hosting  documentation
 Building  packages manually (including porting over existing applications that use a different build system)
 Jolla website
 OpenRepos.net
 FlyingSheep on Sailfisha good reading for developers and porting from MeeGo Harmattan to 

ARM operating systems
Embedded Linux distributions
Finnish brands
Free mobile software
Linux distributions
MeeGo
Mobile Linux
Mobile operating systems
Smartphone operating systems
Software that uses QML
X86-64 Linux distributions
X86-64 operating systems